Period -the Best Selection- is a compilation album by Japanese rock band Luna Sea, released on December 23, 2000, prior to their "Final Act" concerts. All tracks were remastered from their original versions, and tracks 11-13 & 15 were re-recorded just for this release. The album became the band's fourth number one on the Oricon Albums Chart, and charted for nine weeks. In 2001, it was certified Platinum by the RIAJ for sales over 400,000.

Track listing

References 

Luna Sea albums
2000 compilation albums